The Kansas Sports Hall of Fame  is a museum located in Wichita, dedicated to preserving the history of sports in the state of Kansas. The museum provides exhibits, archives, facilities, services, and activities to honor those individuals and teams whose achievements in sports brought distinction to themselves, to their communities and to the entire state of Kansas.

History
The Hall of Fame was founded in 1961 as part of the Kansas Centennial Celebration.  The museum has had a number of homes over the years, and is now located in Wichita, at 238 N. Mead.  Funding for operating expenses is provided in part by donations, admissions, gift shop sales, and special events.  The  museum is not only a family attraction, it is also a facility for entertaining.  The Hall can be used for special events, receptions, and conferences in a variety of settings.

In June 2009 the museum announced the creation of the Kansas Sports Museum, located at The Chisholm Trail Center in Newton, Kansas. The Hall of Fame also announced that it would be moving from its current location at 238 N. Mead to the Wichita Boathouse as part of a cost-saving measure through an agreement with Bill Koch, whose 1992 America's Cup winning yacht America³ is on display there. The new museum in Newton will occupy  in the Chisholm Trail Center, 601 SE 36th St. (I-135 Exit 28). It will house exhibits and memorabilia the hall of fame won’t have room for after it moves to its new location at the Wichita Boathouse.

The Museum in Old Town Wichita is currently closed while the moving and renovation processes are taking place.

What to see

Basketball

Kansas is called the "Cradle of Basketball." Basketball’s inventor, James Naismith, the namesake of the Basketball Hall of Fame is featured prominently in this area of the museum.  Legendary coaches such as Phog Allen, Adolph Rupp, Dean Smith, Ralph Miller, Ted Owens, Eddie Sutton, Jack Hartman, Tex Winter, Gene Keady, Jack Gardner, Dutch Lonborg, John McLendon, Ralph Nolan, Bill Morse, Ron Slaymaker, Bob Chipman, and Walt Shublom are also showcased.

On display NBA and NCAA Basketball jerseys, balls, trophies, plaques and highlights of Kansas high school basketball. It also features displays of the prep dynasties of Dwight, McPherson, Newton, Wichita South, and Wyandotte are prominent as well as recognition of Bishop Miege and Little River Girls basketball dominance.

The museum also has photos and memorabilia from women basketball stars like Lynette Woodard, Jackie Stiles, Kendra Wecker, Nicole Ohlde, Laurie Koehn, Billie Moore, and Marian Washington.

Football

Jerseys, helmets, balls, All-American awards and certificates won by Kansans John Hadl, Lynn Dickey, Nolan Cromwell also by Pro Football Hall of Famers Gale Sayers, John Riggins, Barry Sanders, and Mike McCormack are located in this gallery.

The Governor's Cup, given annually to the winner of the Kansas State University vs. University of Kansas game is on display.  A tribute to K-State's national prominence under Coach Bill Snyder features a photo collection and memorabilia of the Wildcats dynasty.

There is a memorial to honor the lives of Wichita State University football players killed in the tragic WSU plane crash of October 1970.

Kansas' small college football history includes Pittsburg State's national dominance under coaches Carnie Smith, Dennis Franchione, and Chuck Broyles, Bethany College Coach Ted Kessinger, Coffeyville Community College Coach Dick Foster.

Kansas' colorful high school football exhibits include items from perennial state powers Kapaun Mt. Carmel, Lawrence, Midway-Denton, Pittsburg-Colgan, Smith Center, Conway Springs and feature Kansas prep stars like DeAngelo Evans of Wichita Collegiate, Shannon Kruger of Silver Lake, John Riggins of Centralia and Hall of Fame coaches Eddie Kriwiel and Al Woolard.

Baseball
Some of baseball's legendary Kansas stars such as Baseball Hall of Famers Walter Johnson, Joe Tinker and Fred Clarke are presented in the baseball gallery. Photos and memorabilia of the great Wichita State Shocker program under Coach Gene Stephenson with stars like Joe Carter, Darren Dreifort, and Mike Pelfrey are surrounded by vintage photos and memorabilia including autographed pieces by Johnson, Babe Ruth, Mickey Mantle, Mel Ott and countless others.

Kansas City Royals longtime standout player George Brett was inducted in 2017.

The Coleman Company/Johnny Bench Award, given annually to the Collegiate Catcher of the Year by the Wichita Sports Commission is also on display here at the Kansas Sports Hall of Fame as are items from numerous Kansas baseball icons including: Hap Dumont, Elden Auker, Bill Russell, Ralph Houk, Gene Mauch, Daryl Spencer, and Murry Dickson.

Track and Field
The track and field gallery shows off Kansas's reputation as one of the nation's leading producers of track and Olympic stars . Two Olympic gold medals are on display as well as shoes worn by world record holders Jim Ryun, Wes Santee, Al Oerter, Glenn Cunningham, and Thane Baker. 

Olympic champions Billy Mills, Bill Nieder, Maurice Greene, John Kuck, Catherine Fox, Peter Mehringer and Kenny Harrison – and others, are prominently presented. There is also a high jump bar set at 7’ 4 ½”, the Kansas high school record set by Brad Speer of Wichita East in 1984 on display, and hundreds of photos of Kansas high school and college standouts.

Inductees
As of 2017 there are 273 individuals who have been named to the hall of fame, and the class of 2018 added 11 more  for a total of 286.  New members are inducted each fall.  A partial list of Hall-of-Famers includes:

Johnny Adams
Mike Ahearn
Lucius Allen
Phog Allen
Elden Auker
Thane Baker
Ernie Barrett
Bill Bates
Jim Bausch
Mike Bell
Rolando Blackman
Michael Bishop
Bob Boozer
Bob Brannum
George Brett
Chuck Broyles
Kurt Budke
Antoine Carr
Joe Carter
Wilt Chamberlain
Jim Colbert
Nolan Cromwell
Glenn Cunningham
Darren Daulton
Lynn Dickey
Bobby Douglass
Fred Etchen
Mike Evans
Jack Gardner
Martin Gramatica
Steve Grogan
Bill Guthridge
John Hadl
Bill Hargiss
Jack Hartman
Jim Helmer
Ralph Houk
David Jaynes
Walter Johnson
Ewing Kauffman
Al Kelley
Bob Kenney
John Kuck
Lon Kruger
Bill Lienhard
Emil Liston
Cleo Littleton
Clyde Lovellette
Danny Manning
Harold Manning
Xavier McDaniel
Ralph Miller
Billy Mills
Brian Moorman
Margaret Murdock
Willie Murrell
James Naismith
Bill Nieder
Al Oerter
Nicole Ohlde
John Outland
Ted Owens
Paul Pierce
John Riggins
Adolph Rupp
Jim Ryun
Ernie Quigley
Barry Sanders
Archie San Romani
Gale Sayers
Walter Shublom
Wayne Simien
Bill Snyder
David Snyder
Gary Spani
Bud Stallworth
Dave Stallworth
Eddie Sutton
Bill Tidwell
Tom Watson
Garfield Weede
Fran Welch
Jess Willard
Tex Winter
Lynette Woodard

References

External links
 

All-sports halls of fame
State sports halls of fame in the United States
Halls of fame in Kansas
Sports museums in Kansas
Sports in Wichita, Kansas
Museums in Wichita, Kansas
Awards established in 1961
1961 establishments in Kansas